Andrews Branch is a stream in St. Francois County, Missouri. It is a tributary of Terre Bleue Creek.

Andrews Branch has the name of the original owner of the site.

See also
List of rivers of Missouri

References

Rivers of St. Francois County, Missouri
Rivers of Ste. Genevieve County, Missouri
Rivers of Missouri